Paulding County Courthouse may refer to:

 Paulding County Courthouse (Georgia), Dallas, Georgia
 Paulding County Courthouse (Ohio), Paulding, Ohio